Zhu Huang may refer to:

Zhu Wen (852–912), the first Later Liang emperor during the Five Dynasties period, known as Zhu Huang after 907
Zhu Youzhen (888–923), Zhu Wen's son and the last Later Liang emperor, known as Zhu Huang between 913 and 915